The Pseudotriakidae are a small family of ground sharks, belonging to the order Carcharhiniformes, containing the false catsharks (genera Pseudotriakis and Planonasus) and gollumsharks  (genus Gollum). It contains the only ground shark species that exhibit intrauterine oophagy, in which developing fetuses are nourished by eggs produced by their mother.

Undescribed species
One undescribed species is known - one in the genus Gollum, (Gollum sp. B) - the white-marked gollumshark.

References

 
Shark families
Taxa named by Theodore Gill